Rick Revene Frazier (born February 9, 1958) is a former professional basketball player. After transferring from Saint Louis University in 1980, he played on three Big Eight Conference championship and NCAA Tournament teams at Missouri. Frazier led the Tigers in scoring in 1980 and 1981, and formerly held the school record for field goal percentage in a season. He was drafted by the National Basketball Association's Chicago Bulls in 1982.

Frazier was selected to Missouri's "Team of the Decade" for the 1980s.

Honors
All-Big Eight (1981, '82)
All-District (1981, '82)
Big Eight "Player of the Year" (1982)
All-American (1982)
Missouri's "Team of the Decade" (1980s)
Mizzou Basketball All-Century Team

References
 Rickey Frazier started a basketball camp in his hometown of Charleston, Missouri which also emphasizes life and educational values. Ricky believes this camp is the best way for him to give back to basketball.

External links
MUTigers.cstv.com profile
Ricky Frazier, Missouri Stats

1958 births
Living people
African-American basketball players
All-American college men's basketball players
American men's basketball players
Basketball players from Missouri
Chicago Bulls draft picks
Missouri Tigers men's basketball players
People from Charleston, Missouri
Saint Louis Billikens men's basketball players
Small forwards
21st-century African-American people
20th-century African-American sportspeople